Charles Adolph Heinemann (29 February 1904 – 1974) was an English professional footballer who played as an inside forward. During his time with Fordsons he became the  top scorer for the 1927–28 League of Ireland season, scoring 24 times in league competition.

Heinemann also represented the League of Ireland XI in two representative matches against the Welsh League in 1927.

Career statistics
Source:

References

1904 births
1974 deaths
Sportspeople from Stafford
English footballers
Association football inside forwards
Riverscote F.C. players
Stafford Rangers F.C. players
Bristol Rovers F.C. players
Port Vale F.C. players
English expatriate footballers
Expatriate association footballers in Ireland
Fordsons F.C. players
Oakengates Athletic F.C. players
Wallingford Town F.C. players
English Football League players
League of Ireland players